Islampur railway station (station code:- IPR) is located in Islampur, Nalanda district, Bihar state, India. It is come under East Central Railway zone of  division.

Trains
There are many trains from Islampur to other big cities. Islampur is connected directly to New Delhi by the Magadh Express. A new train, the Hatia–Rajendra Nagar–Islampur Intercity Express, is also running. Currently two express trains and two passenger trains, Patna–Islampur Passenger and Fatuha–Islampur Passenger (formerly Buxar–Islampur fast passenger) run on this track.

Electrification
Feasibility studies for the electrification of the Manpur–Tilaiya–Kiul sector and Fatuha–Islampur–Bakhtiyarpur–Rajgir sectors were announced in the rail budget for 2010–11.

Lines
The line was earlier known as Fatuha–Islampur line. A small portion of the line from Islampur to Natesar is still to be opened for use.

See also
 
 
 Magadh Express

References

Railway stations in Nalanda district